Yajilarra is a documentary film by Australian director Melanie Hogan about the resilience of the Aboriginal women in the remote Kimberly region of outback Australia.

‘Yajillara’, in the Bunuba Indigenous language means ‘to dream’.

Inspiration
In 2007 a group of Aboriginal women from the Fitzroy Valley in Australia's remote northwest decided "enough was enough". Their community had experienced 13 suicides in 13 months. Reports of family violence and child abuse were commonplace and alcohol consumption was rising at an alarming rate.

A group of courageous Aboriginal women from across the Valley came together, with the support of many men, to fight for a future for everyone in their community. The results were inspiring and the healing has now begun, with the film playing a key role in the creation and rolling out of alcohol restrictions throughout the Kimberly.

Australian Human Rights Commission
In 2009 an event was hosted by the Federal Sex Discrimination Commissioner Elizabeth Broderick and the Hon. Tanya Plibersek MP, Australian Minister for the Status of Women at the 53rd Session of the UN Commission of the Status of Women (CSW) in New York. This was the first occasion at which Indigenous women form Australia were presented at CSW.

External links
 

Australian documentary films
Documentary films about Aboriginal Australians